was a Japanese photographer.

Works
 A Criminal Investigation. Paris: Xavier Barral; Le Bal, 2011. .
 Morocco
 Postwar Japan
 To the Sea
 Alaska Eskimo
 Stakeout Diary. Tokyo: Roshin, 2014. . Text in Japanese and English. Edition of 1000 copies.

References

Japanese photographers
1924 births
1993 deaths